Thiruttu Payale 2 is a 2017 Indian Tamil-language crime thriller film directed and written by Susi Ganeshan. A spiritual successor to his earlier Thiruttu Payale (2006), the film features Bobby Simha, Prasanna and Amala Paul in the lead roles. The film features music composed by Vidyasagar, while Raja Mohammad was the editor. Produced by AGS Entertainment, the venture began production in October 2016 and was released on 30 November 2017.

The film was remade in Kannada in 2021 as 100 starring Ramesh Aravind. The Hindi remake was reported to be in the making starring Urvashi Rautela and titled as "Dil Hai Gray" The film was dubbed in Hindi as The Digital Thief by Goldmines Telefilms on 20 February 2020.  Prasanna has won Best Supporting Actor for his performance, while Amala paul was nominated for Filmfare Award for Best Actress – Tamil at South Filmfare Awards.

Plot
Selvam is a young police officer who is often transferred from one place to another because of his honesty and sincerity towards his duty as a law enforcer. He rents a room in the same apartment complex as a college student, Agalya. They both fall in love and get married after he gets transferred back to their hometown in Chennai.

Because of Selvam's clean reputation, he is handpicked by a O. Nagarajan IPS, the Inspector General of Police of Police Intelligence, to tape and trace phone calls of VIPs and VVIPs in the state of Tamil Nadu. By tapping these secret conversations, he exposes various scandals that often lead to the downfall of many high-ranking officials and wealthy businessmen. However, he comes to realize that he is never rewarded for his honesty and starts tracing the calls of other members of the elite class that has not been assigned to him. That way, he manages to blackmail them for their Indian black money, which he then registers under the name of a Benami.

One day, Selvam is instructed to tape the incoming and outgoing calls from the house of a high-ranking official. During one such tapping, Selvam comes across a conversation between the official's wife and her secret lover, Balakrishnan, or "Balki". Despite being a topper at his engineering college, Software Engineer Balki spends most of his time seducing various young and married women through Facebook. He receives handsome sums from his victims and lives alone in a palatial bungalow in center of the city after chasing away his father. By mere accident, Selvam discovers that Agal is also one of his many lovers. Selvam then starts tapping his own wife's calls. He soon realizes that Balki is a sociopath who seduces women. After recording their conversations and rendezvous together, Balki blackmails them for money. Initially, Agal trusted Balki as a good friend and shared all her secrets with him, then she discovers his evil intentions and blocks him on Facebook. Balki starts threatening Agal to sleep with him. Enraged, Selvam decides to take the matter in his own hands. With the help of a private detective named Ganesh, he gets the complete details of Balki and confronts him.

Balki reveals that he had already expected Selvam to confront him, and he has already hacked Selvam's personal computer and has stolen all the details of the tapping and evidences that Selvam has collected so far. He has also secretly recorded Agal bathing at their home and uses this to blackmail Selvam. Selvam tries to abduct Balki but is forced to let him go after discovering that Balki has stored all the hacked data on his online Swiss bank account. If he does not key in his secret password within a specific time period on a day-to-day basis, the data will be leaked automatically, tarnishing both Selvam's personal and professional life.

Selvam then arranges for one of his female subordinates to seduce Balki while he is at a local café. Meanwhile, he and a computer hacker he knows break into Balki's home to hack into his Swiss account. However, Balki has installed multiple firewalls that make his account foolproof. When Balki returns home, he realizes that Selvam has broken in and ran away before he returned. He decides to enrage him even more by forcing Agal to meet him at his home. She comes only to tell him to leave her alone or she would tell her husband about him. Balki ignores her threats by coming straight to her home. Both Selvam and Agal pretend to be nice to him in order to keep their own secrets while Balki enjoys himself tormenting them. Selvam feels that Balki is not serious about leaking the audio files and goes to meet Balki's estranged father, to get his help to bring down the sociopath.

To provoke Selvam even further, Balki leaks a taping of a Inspector general of Police in order to get Selvam into trouble. Thinking he would get into trouble, Selvam is instead congratulated by Nagarajan for publicly removing his fellow IPS from competing with him for job of State Director general of Police. However, when the scandal escalates, the higher-ups in the police decide they need a scapegoat to take responsibility, and they try to frame Selvam. Police suddenly raid Selvam's house and it causes an uproar in police colony. Realizing that Nagarajan is framing him, he blackmails him with his Audio-tapes, which are proof enough to destroy Nagarajan. All complaints against Selvam are dropped, and he is permitted for one-week foreign holiday.

Selvam's Benami has invested all the money they have looted so far on the construction of a luxurious holiday resort in Langkawi, Malaysia. Selvam ignores all of Balki's phone calls and instead takes Agal to the resort for a short vacation. Once there, he reveals that he has been approached to become the head of security for this new resort and he plans to leave the police force. At the same time, Balki is infuriated that Selvam is ignoring him and comes to the resort to confront him. While Selvam is away, Balki breaks into their holiday suite and tries to rape Agal. As he is about to corner her, he falls unconscious, allowing Agal to escape. At the same time, Selvam returns and manages to break into Balki's Swiss account by using his eye for recognition. He erases all of the stolen data and saves himself. It is then revealed that after Balki's father met with Selvam, he finally convinced his son to allow the old man to live with him, as a servant. To stop Balki from doing anymore harm to society, his father has been slowly poisoning him with small doses of poison that eventually leads him into a permanent vegetative state. The final component of the poisoning was done at the transit airport, by a call girl set by selvam.

Selvam and Agal return to India to make the final arrangements before they immigrate overseas. Balki is shown to have become vegetative. However, Selvam's Benami is shown to be mysteriously killed, and Selvam has lost his wealth. He was actually killed by Ganesh who has looted all the property amassed by Selvam.

Cast

 Bobby Simha as Selvam, a corrupt police inspector 
 Prasanna as Balakrishnan (Balki), a sociopath who seduces women
 Amala Paul as Agalya Selvam, a college student and Selvam's wife
 Susi Ganeshan as Detective Ganesh, a private detective who teams up with Selvam
 Soundararaja as Maari
 M. S. Bhaskar
 Kavithalaya Krishnan
 Muthuraman as O. Nagarajan IPS
 Pradeep K Vijayan as Jashwant Seth, Selvam's Benami
 Naadodigal Gopal
 Shyam Prasad as HTV Employee 
 Jegannath Nambi as News Channel Debate Host
 Shalu Shamu as Anitha
 PV Chandramoulli
 Thameem Ansari
 Nayana
 Esra
 Ananth
 R. K. Mohideen

Production
In April 2016, AGS Entertainment announced that they would team up with director Susi Ganeshan for a sequel to their 2006 film, Thiruttu Payale. Early reports suggested that either Jeevan, Prasanna or Nakul would play the lead role. Consequently, in August 2016, Bobby Simha was revealed as the lead actor, while Prasanna was signed on to play the antagonist, thus teaming up with the director for the second time after 14 years. He had earlier made his debut with the movie Five Star, which released in 2002, which was also the director's debut film. Amala Paul was signed on to play the film's lead actress, while comedians Vivek and Robo Shankar were reportedly signed on for supporting roles. Eventually, Vivek nor Robo Shankar were seen in the film. Likewise Sanam Shetty briefly signed on to portray a detective, but was later replaced by Nayana. The film began production during November 2016, following a launch ceremony, with the shoot progressing in Chennai and Thailand.

Music 

The soundtrack album of Thiruttu Payale 2 composed by Vidyasagar was launched at an open event held on 1 September 2017, at Forum Vijaya Mall in Chennai which was telecasted live on Thanthi TV the very same day. The album features four songs and were penned by Pa. Vijay, and Vidyasagar also sung the title track of the film. The album received mixed reviews from critics, however "Nee Parkkum" which was sung by Sathyaprakash was praised, but the other songs were criticised. The song is a love based melodious number with a beautiful tune, and a pleasant number with instruments like harmonica, keys and sarangi used.

Behindwoods rated the album 2.5 out of 5 stating that "A typical melody based album by Vidyasagar for Thiruttu Payale 2!" Moviecrow rated the album 2.75 out of 5, stating "Vidyasagar's quality melodies continue to work effectually for this sequel and it's baffling that this composer is less in action nowadays."

In a positive note, Sharanya CR, writing for The Times of India in her review stated "Nee Paarkum" as "a lilting song, with soothing guitar portions in the background". The theme song of Thiruttuppayale — 2, "has a jazzy feel, with use of thavil beats and harmonica adds a different layer to the song." Then she stated "Achukku Buchukku" as "a passable listen" reserved only for theatres. And for the final track "Neenda Naal" as a "melodious one". In her bottomline she stated "It is great to have Vidyasagar back after a long hiatus!"

Release
The satellite rights of the film were sold to Zee Tamil.

Awards and nominations

References

External links
 

2017 films
2010s Tamil-language films
Indian sequel films
Indian crime thriller films
Techno-thriller films
Tamil films remade in other languages
Films directed by Susi Ganeshan
2017 crime thriller films